Corpus Christi High School may refer to:

Corpus Christi Catholic High School, Wollongong in Australia
Corpus Christi Catholic Secondary School in Burlington, Ontario
Corpus Christi Roman Catholic High School, Cardiff in the United Kingdom
Pallikoodam School in Kottayam, India (formerly called Corpus Christi High School)
 Roy Miller High School in Corpus Christi, Texas (formerly called Corpus Christi High School)

See also
 Corpus Christi Catholic College, Leeds